Vehicles also include motorcycles, bicycles, and police boats. There are other vehicles that are not on this list.

The NYPD also have unmarked vehicles that consist of many makes and models. Some units will be assigned normal police unmarked vehicles, while detectives, vice, special investigations, etc, may be assigned vehicles that are hard to distinguish from a regular car.

See also

Police vehicles in the United States and Canada

References

External links

Vehicles
Police vehicles